Sulem is a surname. Notable people with the surname include:

Agnès Sulem (born 1959), French mathematician
Agnès Sulem-Bialobroda, violinist for the Rosamonde Quartet
Catherine Sulem (born 1957), Canadian mathematician and violinist
Jean Sulem (born 1959), French violist

See also
Sulem Sarai, town in India
Sulem Lake, in Minnesota, US